Nonpoint source, or non-point source, or NPS, is a source that does not come from a single point.
 Point source, contrasts with nonpoint source
 Nonpoint source pollution, water pollution
 Nonpoint source water pollution regulations, water pollution regulations

See also 
 Nonpoint